Mish Rangin-e Hajji Qader (also Romanized as Mīsh Rangīn-e Ḩājjī Qāder; also known as Mīsh Rangīn) is a village in Jeygaran Rural District, Ozgoleh District, Salas-e Babajani County, Kermanshah Province, Iran. At the 2006 census, its population was 89, in 16 families.

References 

Populated places in Salas-e Babajani County